David Richard Floyd-Jones (April 6, 1813 – January 8, 1871) was an American lawyer and politician.

Early life
A descendant of an old Long Island family, he was born at the family mansion on the Fort Neck estate in South Oyster Bay, New York (then Queens, now Nassau County). He was the eldest son of Brig.-Gen. Thomas Floyd-Jones (1788–1851) and Cornelia Haring ( Jones) Floyd-Jones (1796–1839). Among his siblings were merchant William Floyd-Jones, Assemblyman Elbert Floyd-Jones, and Sarah Maria Floyd-Jones (wife of Coleman Williams).

His paternal grandparents were David Richard Floyd-Jones and Sarah ( Onderdonk) Floyd-Jones and his maternal grandfather was Maj. William Jones. Among his extended family was his uncle, New York State Senator Henry Floyd-Jones, and first cousin, Col. DeLancey Floyd-Jones. He was a descendant of William Floyd, signer of the Declaration of Independence, and Maj. Thomas Jones who owned what is known today as Jones Beach.

He was educated at Christ Church Academy in Manhasset, and graduated from Union College in 1832.

Career
After studying law in Schenectady with Judge Samuel W. Jones, he was admitted to the bar and began practicing law in New York City in 1835 in partnership with James P. Howard. He was a Democratic member of the New York State Assembly (New York Co.) in 1841, 1842 and 1843.

He was a member of the New York State Senate (1st D.) from 1844 to 1847, sitting in the 67th, 68th, 69th and 70th New York State Legislatures. He was a delegate to the New York State Constitutional Convention of 1846. He was again a member of the State Assembly (Queens Co.) in 1857.

He was Secretary of State of New York from 1860 to 1861, elected in November 1859; and Lieutenant Governor of New York from 1863 to 1864, elected in November 1862.

Personal life
On June 24, 1845, Floyd-Jones was married to Mary Louisa Stanton (1818–1906), a daughter of George Washington Stanton and Sally ( Morgan) Stanton. Together, they had seven children, including:

 Stanton Floyd-Jones (1846–1848), who died young.
 George Stanton Floyd-Jones (1848–1941), president of Atlantic Mutual Insurance Company; he married Anita Owen.
 Thomas Richard Floyd-Jones (1851–1857), who died young.
 Mary Louisa Floyd-Jones (1853–1939), who died unmarried.
 Henrietta Floyd-Jones (1855–1897), a graduate of St. Mary's Hall who joined the Sisterhood of St. John the Baptist.
 Sarah Hall Floyd-Jones (b. 1857), who married Capt. Nathaniel W. Barnardiston, an officer in the Duke of Cambridge's Own (Middlesex Regiment) in 1892.
 Thomas Langley Floyd-Jones (1859–1861), who died young.

He died at the family mansion in 1871, and was buried at the Floyd-Jones Cemetery, on his Fort Neck estate. His widow died on July 22, 1906.

Sources

External links
  Political Graveyard
 Floyd-Jones family

Democratic Party members of the New York State Assembly
Democratic Party New York (state) state senators
Lieutenant Governors of New York (state)
Secretaries of State of New York (state)
1813 births
1871 deaths
Union College (New York) alumni
19th-century American politicians